Raczki may refer to:

Raczki, Masovian Voivodeship (east-central Poland)
Raczki, Podlaskie Voivodeship (north-east Poland)
Raczki, West Pomeranian Voivodeship (north-west Poland)
Rączki, Świętokrzyskie Voivodeship (south-central Poland)
Rączki, Warmian-Masurian Voivodeship (north Poland)